Dampier is an English toponymic surname, from one of several places named Dampierre in France. People with the surname include:

Alex Dampier (b. 1951), Canadian-British athlete and coach in ice hockey
Alfred Dampier (1843–1908), English-born actor and playwright, active in Australia
Claude Dampier (1879–1955), English actor
Erick Dampier, American basketball player
Jeffrey Dampier (1966–2005), American lottery winner and murder victim
John Dampier (1750–1826), English athlete in cricket
Lily Dampier (1859 (?) – 1915), Australian actor
Louie Dampier (b. 1944), American basketball player
Robert Dampier (1799–1874), English artist
Thomas Dampier (1748–1812), English cleric
Thomas Dampier (priest) (ca. 1700–1777), English cleric and educator
William Dampier (1651–1715), English explorer, the first person to circumnavigate the Earth three times
William Cecil Dampier (1867–1952), British scientist, agriculturist and science historian

References